Omer Sohail Zia Butt (born 19 July 1980) is a Pakistani politician who had been a member of the National Assembly of Pakistan from 2008 to 2013.

Early life
He was born on 19 July 1980.

Political career
He was elected to the National Assembly of Pakistan from Constituency NA-126 (Lahore-IX) as a candidate of Pakistan Muslim League (N) (PML-N) in 2008 Pakistani general election. He received 69,718 votes and defeated Syed Hasnat Ahmed, a candidate of Pakistan Peoples Party (PPP).

References

Living people
1980 births
Pakistani MNAs 2008–2013